Abdul Quader Mollah (14 August 1948 – 12 December 2013) was a Bangladeshi Islamist leader, writer, and politician of the Bangladesh Jamaat-e-Islami, who was convicted of war crimes and sentenced to death by the International Crimes Tribunal, Bangladesh (ICT) set up by the government of Bangladesh and hanged. There were objections from the United Nations, the governments of several countries, including Turkey, and international human rights organizations but there was widespread support from the general public of Bangladesh for the execution.

He was convicted on five of six counts of crimes against humanity and war crimes at his trial at the ICT, on 5 February 2013. A member of the Al-Badar militia during the liberation war, Mollah was convicted of killing 344 civilians and other crimes, and was sentenced to life in prison. This led to the 2013 Shahbag protests that demanded capital punishment for the convicted war criminals  and the disbandment of Jamaat-e-Islami. Jamaat-e-Islami started a violent counter-protest in the country, demanding the release of its convicted and accused leaders. 

On 17 September 2013, after an amendment to the ICT law allowing the government, complainant, or informant to appeal an order of acquittal or order of sentencing, the Bangladesh Supreme Court ruled Mollah guilty of murders and other war crimes, and converted his life sentence to a death sentence. He was scheduled to be executed by hanging on 11 December. Due to more legal challenges, the execution was suspended and then upheld; he was executed on 12 December. He was the first person to have been executed for crimes committed during the Bangladesh Liberation War.

Quader Mollah had unsuccessfully stood for parliament in 1986 and 1996, contesting the seat Faridpur-4 for Jamaat-e-Islami.

Early life
Abdul Quader Mollah was born in the village of Amirabad, Faridpur, in 1948. He attended school at Amirabad Fazlul Huq Institute. He passed the H.S.C examination in 1966 and did BSc in 1968 from Rajendra College. While studying, he was elected president of the Shahidullah Hall unit of the student wing of Bangladesh Jamaat-e-Islami – Islami Chatra Sangha.
Quader Mollah worked as a senior teacher at Rifles Public School and College (now Bir Shreshtha Noor Mohammad Public College). He later became the acting principal of the institute for a short period during the regime of Ziaur Rahman. He was elected as the Vice President of Dhaka Journalists' Union for two consecutive terms in 1982 and 1983. Mollah was married to Sanwar Jahan.

Political career
In 1971 leaders of Jamaat opposed the independence movement in East Pakistan. As a member of Islami Chatra Sangha, Quader Mollah joined its paramilitary force, Al-Badar, during the Liberation war of Bangladesh. He was known as Butcher of Mirpur during the war. Bangladesh achieved independence that year and eventually Jamaat was banned from political participation under the new government.

After assassination of the president Sheikh Mujibur Rahman in 1975 and a military coup, the new government permitted Jamaat to participate in politics again. Quader Mollah became active in the party. By 2010 he was assistant secretary general of the party. He was expelled from Bangladesh National Press Club in 2013. In 1996, prior to the controversial February elections, he was arrested along with Awami League leader Tofael Ahmed under the Special Power Act, 1974.

As the verdict of a ruling asked by Bangladesh Supreme Court, the registration of the Jamaat-e-Islami was cancelled on 1 August 2013.

War crimes trial
In the 21st century, the government of Bangladesh established an International Crimes Tribunal to prosecute war crimes that were committed in 1971 during the liberation war. A formal charge was filed by the Prosecution against Abdul Quader Mollah on 18 December 2011 in the form of a petition, as required under Section 9(1) of the 1973 Act.

He was charged with abetting the Pakistani army and actively participating in the 1971 Bangladesh atrocities:  rape (including the rape of minors) and mass murder of Bangladeshis in the Mirpur area of Dhaka during the Bangladesh Liberation War. A member of the Rajakar militia during the war, Mollah was charged with killing 344 civilians.

Charges
Charges filed against Quader Mollah by ICT were:
Charge 1: On Quader Molla's instruction, one of his aides named Akhter killed Pallab, a student of Bangla College and an organiser of the Liberation War, on 5 April 1971. Pallab was buried by the side of Kalapani Jheel along with several other bodies. Pallab was taken to an Eidgah at Mirpur-12, where he was shot to death.
Charge 2: On 27 March 1971, Quader Molla's aides murdered pro-liberation poet Meherun Nesa, her mother and two brothers at their house at Mirpur-6.
Charge 3: On 29 March 1971, Abdul Quader Mollah along with other members of Al Badr, Razakar and non-Bangalees detained Khandakar Abu Taleb from Mirpur 10 bus stand and tied him up with a rope. He was brought to the Mirpur Jallad Khana Pump House and killed.
Charge 4: On 25 November 1971, Quader Mollah with his 70 accomplices went to the village of Khanbari and Ghotan Char, now Shaheed Nagar of Keraniganj, and abducted two unarmed freedom fighters from the house of Mozaffar Ahmed Khan. Freedom fighters Osman Gani and Golam Mostafa were brutally murdered by charging bayonet.
Charge 5: Attack and indiscriminate shooting by Quader Mollah and his gang killed hundreds of unarmed people of the two villages. Among them, 24 persons were named in the charge. On the early morning of 24 April, members of Pakistan occupation forces and around 50 non-Bangalees in the presence of Quader Mollah raided Alubdi village of Mirpur and attacked unarmed villagers, killing 344 people.
Charge 6: On 26 March 1971 in the evening, some Bihari and Pakistani soldiers led by Quader Mollah killed Hazrat Ali and five members of his family at Mirpur. Entering his house, the soldiers shot dead Hazrat and killed wife Amina and daughters Khadija and Tahmina. That day they also killed his only son, two-year-old Babu, by bashing the baby against the ground.

Verdict
On 5 February 2013, Mollah was convicted of five of the six charges, and acquitted on one charge as it was determined it had not been proved by the prosecution. He was sentenced to life in prison and an additional 15 years for three of the charges in addition to the time he had been imprisoned since his arrest. The one remaining charge was dismissed after it was determined the prosecution had not proved it.

When the court gave him a life sentence instead of the death penalty, which many expected, a smiling Mollah celebrated the verdict by holding up two fingers in a "V" sign as he left the court.

Reaction after verdict
Many activists reacted by protesting and demonstrating, demanding the death penalty and an end to extremism in politics. A major protest started at the Shahbag intersection in central Dhaka. Bloggers and online activists called for further mass demonstration at Shahbag intersection. Thousands of people joined the protest and the demonstration culminated in the 2013 Shahbag protests.

During the protests, hundreds of thousands of people held day-and-night vigils at Shahbag, refusing to leave until all those convicted of war crimes were sentenced to death. A counter-protest against the trials and general strike was launched by Jamaat-e-Islami, as most of the accused were Jamaat leaders.

The Bangladesh Nationalist Party (BNP) had initially expressed support for Jamaat-e-Islami, a principal ally in their Four-Party Alliance in the 2000s. The BNP has commented on the Shahbag Protest, warning that the government should not be allowed to draw political mileage from the movement that demanded capital punishment for convicted war criminals.

Responding to the demand of the Shahbag activists, on 13 February 2013, the National Press Club of Bangladesh stripped Quader Mollah of his membership. On 17 February 2013, the Bangladeshi Parliament passed a bill amending the International Crimes (Tribunal) Act of 1973 which allowed the government, complainant, or informant to appeal an order of acquittal or order of sentencing.

Jamaat members have also led protests against the trials, saying that the government is trying to suppress the opposition. It called for a general strike in Dhaka, shutting down activity in the city.

Controversies

In December 2012, conversations and emails between the chief judge of the ICT, Nizamul Huq, and a Brussels-based lawyer were published in The Economist, which revealed that the Bangladesh Government had pressured the ICT for a quick verdict. Following the revelations, Justice Nizamul Huq resigned from the tribunal. The European Union, the UK, Turkey and Australia expressed their concern as they believed the death penalty violated human rights. Two UN Human Rights Commission experts called on to halt the execution because of concerns that Abdul Quader Mollah did not receive a fair trial."The right of appeal is of particular importance in death penalty cases," said the Special Rapporteur (UN) on the independence of judges and lawyers, Gabriela Knaul. Christof Heyns, Special Rapporteur (UN) on summary executions, said capital punishment "may be imposed only following a trial that complied with fair trial and due process safeguards. Only full respect for stringent due process guarantees distinguishes capital punishment as possibly permitted under international law from a summary execution, which by definition violates human rights standards."
The International Commission of Jurists (ICJ) says the retrospective application of the amendment in Abdul Quader Molla's case is incompatible with Bangladesh's obligations under the International Covenant on Civil and Political Rights (ICCPR), including Article 15, which prohibits the imposition of a heavier penalty than provided for at the time the criminal offence was committed.
Baroness Warsi stated, "We further note that Abdul Quader Mollah was sentenced to death following an appeal permitted under retrospectively applied legislation, and that he was not permitted to review his sentence before the Supreme Court". Human Rights Watch said that the death sentence of Abdul Quader Mollah violates fair trial standards, stating "Changing the law and applying it retroactively after a trial offends basic notions of a fair trial under international law."

Death sentence and execution
After the government had amended the war crimes law to allow a sentence to be appealed based on leniency of punishment, prosecutors appealed to the Supreme Court of Bangladesh and asked for it to upgrade Molla's sentence from life in prison to death. On 17 September 2013, the Supreme Court accepted the appeal and sentenced Mollah to death. He was not given a right to appeal, as the war crimes law under which he was prosecuted did not have a provision granting that right. Mollah was one of five leaders of the largest Islamic Party, Jamaat-e-Islami condemned to death by Bangladesh's International Crimes Tribunal. He was scheduled to be executed by hanging on 11 December 2013 at 0:01. On 8 December, the International Crimes Tribunal issued an execution warrant for Molla, and delivered it to the relevant authorities. Prisons chief Main Uddin Khandaker then said that all preparations had been made and that Quader Molla's family had been asked to meet him prior to the execution. Mollah refused to ask for a presidential pardon though the authorities approached him thrice on the matter.

Molla's lawyers asked the Supreme Court to halt the execution and allow him to appeal, as Bangladesh's constitution grants all death row prisoners the right of appeal. Supreme Court chamber judge Syed Mahmoud Hossain accepted these arguments issued a stay of execution order to give Mollah time to appeal on 11 December 2013, just 90 minutes before he was scheduled to be executed. Following two hours of hearings, Chief Justice Muzammel Hossain adjourned the hearing till the next day. Amongst the defence's arguments was that the state was proceeding with preparations for the execution without completing all necessary legal procedures.

The appellate division of Bangladesh Supreme Court, which raised Quader Molla's life sentence to a death penalty, rejected his petition to review the ruling. Attorney General Mahbubey Alam said that the government would decide on a new execution date as "there are no more barriers to execute Quader Mollah. There is no chance of any confusion." His lawyer, Khandaker Mahbub Hossain, added that "my client has been deprived of fair justice, but since the highest court has made the decision, we have nothing more to say."

Quader Mollah was hanged in Dhaka Central Jail on 12 December 2013 at 22:01. The Bangladesh Jamaat-E-Islami called it a "political killing". More significantly, a segment of Bangladeshi people and some human rights observant in Bangladesh and abroad, they do, believe the hanged of Quader Mollah was not only a "political killing" but also a "judicial killing." He was later buried in his village of Faridpur.

Domestic reaction

Shahbag protesters, who started rallying from 5 February 2013 for the capital punishment of Quader Molla, expressed their delight after the execution.
After the schedule and the execution of Quader Molla, Bangladesh Jamaat-e-Islami started violent protest and called for general strike on 11, 12 and 15 December 2013. Almost 25 persons died and many other injured in different parts of the country during their protests. During the protests JEI activists torched homes and businesses of government supporters and firebombed train stations and blocked roads. The party called the execution "political murder" and warned of exacting revenge for "every drop" of his blood. Two activists from the ruling Awami League were hacked to death in Kalaroa; one other person died in clashes between police and JEI supporters in Noakhali, while a driver was reportedly killed after JEI protesters chased him down. As a result of the violent reaction, and in combination with violence in the lead up to the 2014 Bangladeshi general election, Prime Minister Sheikh Hasina vowed to crack down on the violence. The rioting, and the preceding opposition blockade, caused economic losses, with fear of escalating protests, prior to the election.

International reaction

The international media did not cover the execution except with brief agency reports.  Very few governments reacted to the hanging.  China, the world's most active user of the death penalty, did not issue any official statements at any level.  India, Bangladesh's biggest neighbour and No. 1 trading partner, did not issue any official reaction although the Indian media actively covered the execution and the buildup to the same. Protests against his execution were held in London and Pakistan.

Official reactions

 – The state of Qatar condemned the execution and stated that it was concerned that Molla's death would exacerbate tensions. 
 - The National Assembly of the Islamic Republic of Pakistan passed a resolution vote to condemn the hanging of Abdul Quader Molla. Interior Minister Chaudhry Nisar Ali Khan described the punishment of Bangladesh Jamaat-i-Islami leader as "judicial murder".

Reaction from other groups
 Muslim Council of Britain – "It is a sad day for Bangladesh and sad day for democracy and justice. The trial process of Abdul Quader Mollah was fraught with flaws and the international community including the UN and all respected Human Rights organisations world over strongly criticised the trial as unfair, biased and politically driven."
Islamic Circle of North America – "This is a political murder and a dark day for justice."

See also
 List of Bangladeshi criminals

References

1948 births
2013 deaths
Bangladesh Jamaat-e-Islami politicians
Bangladeshi Muslims
Bangladeshi people convicted of crimes against humanity
Bangladeshi people convicted of war crimes
Executed Bangladeshi people
1971 Bangladesh genocide perpetrators
21st-century executions by Bangladesh
People from Faridpur District
Executed politicians
People executed for crimes against humanity
People executed for war crimes
Bangladeshi politicians convicted of crimes
Bangladeshi male criminals
People executed by Bangladesh by hanging
Executed mass murderers